The Estado Mayor Presidencial — EMP was the institution charged with protecting and safeguarding the President of Mexico, the First Lady of Mexico and their immediate families. It is described in its regulations as a techno-military organism and an administrative unit (Military staff) of the Presidency of the Republic of Mexico in facilitating the President's fulfillment of his attributes and functions.

The EMP was part of the Mexican Army, and a General always led it, embodied in the Jefatura del Estado Mayor Presidencial. Its last Jefatura was led by General Roberto Francisco Miranda Moreno, whom President Enrique Peña Nieto appointed.

History
It was disbanded on December 1, 2018 by President Andrés Manuel López Obrador by amending the Organization Act on the Mexican Army and Air Force with 108 votes in favor, none against, and 12 abstentions in the Mexican Senate. Ex-EMP personnel would be assigned to their original units in the Mexican military with ranks and benefits.

Organization

The Presidential Guard consisted of three infantry battalions, two military police battalions, one special force battalion, and one artillery battalion, plus a Marine battalion from the Naval Infantry Force, a Cavalry Horse Guards squadron with an attached horse artillery battery and a state artillery honor battery as well as a War Band (Banda de Guerra).

Training

Presidential Guard included a reaction group, (grupo de reacción inmediata y potente, GRIP), whose members were trained in martial arts such as karate, aikijutsu, tae kwon do, kick boxing, kung fu, judo, and silat; furthermore, they were trained in techniques and tactics in order to protect high-ranking officials and civil servants, such as the President.

References

External links
 Overview of the role of Estado Mayor Presidencial (Spanish)
 Organisation Chart of Estado Mayor Presidencial (Spanish)

Military units and formations of Mexico
Specialist law enforcement agencies of Mexico
Guards of honour